Parliamentary elections were held in Guam in 1960. The Popular Party won all 21 seats, in a "blackjack victory".

Electoral system
The 21 members of the Legislature were elected from a single district, with the candidates receiving the most votes being elected. Candidates were required to be at least 25 years old and have lived in Guam for at least five years before the election.

Results
The Popular Party won all 21 seats, with the Territorial Party left seatless.

References

1960 in Guam
1960
1960 elections in Oceania